La sonrisa del Diablo (English: The Devil's Smile) is a Mexican telenovela directed by Arturo Ripstein and produced by Ernesto Alonso for Televisa in 1992.

Rebecca Jones starred as antagonistic protagonist, while Ernesto Laguardia, Enrique Álvarez Félix, Jorge Vargas, Gabriela Hassel, Marcela Páez and Blanca Sánchez starred as stellar performances.

Plot 
Deborah San Román is an attractive and ambitious young woman who knows right and wrong and will stop at nothing, not even to crime, to accomplish her purposes. Young men need to feel admiration confident, but when you get bored of your love in turn, does not hesitate to break up with him and planting a path of destruction, suicide, moral and economic misery.

She has never loved anyone but the time comes when you are passionate about Rafael Galicia, a young man so unscrupulous as her. Rafael owns famous antique shop, which used both as a screen to sell stolen goods and contraband anything to give your brother, invalid as a result of a crash he caused, economic security, health care and education.

During one of the frequent trips to the border Rafael, Deborah met Salvador Esparza, the man who is in love with her sister Laura. Salvador is a rich widow, whom Deborah easily entangles with its charms, but the children of Salvador, Beto and Patricia, hate it from the start, and even more when her father marries sense that it is after his fortune.

Laura, desolate, tries to return to his village, but he suffers an accident as a result of which he loses his memory, and during this phase enters a world previously unknown to her. When Rafael returns Deborah proposes to sustain their relationships, but now secretly since has become a married woman.

Meanwhile, Salvador begin to discover the machinations and deceptions of Deborah, which by their negative characteristics, will prejudicando and betraying all those around her, but probably love and honesty to achieve defeat.

Cast 

 Rebecca Jones as Deborah San Román
 Ernesto Laguardia as Rafael Galicia
 Enrique Álvarez Félix as Salvador Esparza
 Jorge Vargas as Carlos Uribe
 Gabriela Hassel as Marilí Uribe
 Marcela Páez as Laura San Román
 Blanca Sánchez as Martha Esparza
 Ramón Abascal as Beto Esparza
 Katia del Río as Patricia Esparza
 Emilia Carranza as Antonia Esparza
 Jaime Garza as Víctor
 Elena Silva as Beatriz Gorozpe
 Gilberto Román as Roberto Hiniestra
 Miguel Ángel Negrete as Federico Espino
 Marco Hernán as Ramón Durán
 Mauricio Bonet as Junior Rodríguez
 Isaura Espinoza as Leonor
 César Castro  as Ingeniero Salgado
 Yolanda Ciani as Casandra Adler
 Rosario Gálvez as Lena San Román
 Anel as Perla
 Adriana Parra as Rocío
 Gerardo Hemmer as Genaro Galicia
 Ismael Larumbe as Torritos
 Aurora Cortés as Enedina
 Juan Carlos Serrán as Poncho
 Rosario Zuñiga as Connie
 Alejandro Camacho as Mr. Morelli (special appearance)

Awards

References

External links

1992 telenovelas
Mexican telenovelas
1992 Mexican television series debuts
1992 Mexican television series endings
Spanish-language telenovelas
Television shows set in Mexico
Televisa telenovelas
Children's telenovelas